Vincent (12 February 1946 - 30 August 1991) was an Indian actor from Kerala. He was active during the 1970s and 80s and acted in about 160+ Malayalam films, many of them as leading actor. Born in Edavanakad Vypin, he was a romantic and action hero of his time.

Personal life

Vincent was married to Mary, who was working as a teacher in Chennai Public School, Chennai. He died of a heart attack on 31 August 1991 at the age of 45. Vincent's wife Mary died on 15 October 2016 in a road accident near Thirumangalam, Chennai. They are survived by their two sons; Roby Vincent, an assistant film director who was with Director Bala and is currently working in Tamil and Malayalam films. Second son is Richard Lazaar Vincent, who is in Dubai.

Career
Vincent started his career in the late 1960s and became one of the most successful Malayalam film actors of the 1970s. He performed with such notable leading men as Sathyan, Prem Nazir, Madhu, Jayan, M. G. Soman, and Kamal Haasan. He had acted opposite many leading heroines of Malayalam film including Sridevi, Sheela, Jayabharathi, Vijayasree, Vidhubala, Rani Chandra, Lakshmi, and Srividya. He was famous for his performances in various films in the 1970s including Ulsavam (1975) and Anubhavam (1976), both directed by I. V. Sasi. One of his last notable films was Inspector Balram, released in 1991.

Filmography

 1991 – Inspector Balram
 1991 – Goodbye To Madras
 1991 – Raid as Sathyasheelan
 1990 – Avasanathe Rathri
 1990 – Nammude Naadu as Gopinath
 1989 – Kali karyamaai: Crime Branch as Anandan
 1988 – 1921
 1988 – Abkari
 1988 – Charavalayam as Chalayil Ouseppachan
 1988 – Evidence
 1988 –  Bheekaran as Gopi
 1988 – Theruvu Narthaki as Raghunadhan
 1988 – Janmashatru as Nissar
 1987 – Nalkkavala
 1987 – Ee Nootandile Maharogam
 1987 – Mangalya Charthu as Srikumar
 1987 – Kaalathinte Sabhdam as Chandrabhanu
 1987 – Kalarathri
 1987 – Vrutham as Customs Officer
 1987 – Kanikanum Nerom
 1986 – Adukkan Enteluppam
 1986 – Niramulla Raavukal
 1986 – Pidikittapulli
 1985 – Idanilangal as Kittunni
 1985 – Kiratham
 1985 - Angadikkappurathu as Police Inspector
 1985 – Madhuvidhu Therum Munpe
 1985 – Karimbinpoovinakkare
 1984 – Unaroo 
 1984 – Nishedi as Karunakara Kurup
 1984 – Oru Nimisham Tharoo as Madhu
 1984 – Adiyozhukkukal 
 1984 – Vikadakavi
 1983 – Ineyenkilum as Avarachan
 1983 – Ente Katha 
 1983 – Belt Mathai 
 1983 – Varanamer Awashmundu
 1983 – Asuran
 1983 – Lourde Mathavu
 1982 – Innalenkil Nale
 1982 – Vidichathum Kothichathum as Damu
 1982 – Jambulingam
 1981 – Asthamikkatha Pakalukal as Babu
 1981 – Avatharam as Jamal
 1981 – Arathi
 1981 – Guha as Dr Prasad
 1980 – Swargadevatha
 1980 – Ithikara Pakki
 1979 – Arattu 
 1979 – Kannukal
 1979 – Swapnagal Swanthamalla
 1979 – Lajjavathi as Rajashekharan Nair
 1979 – Pancharathnam
 1979 – Nithyavasantham 
 1979 – Iniyum Kanam as Devan
 1979 – College Beauty
 1979 – Lilly Pookkal 
 1979 – Manavadharam 
 1979 – Kochuthampuratti
 1979 – Ival Oru Nadodi
 1979 – Ponnil Kulicha Rathri
 1979 – Mani Koya Kuruppu
 1978 – Sootrakari
 1978 – Madhurikkunna Rathri
 1978 – Aval Vishvashthayairunnu as Johny
 1978 – Avakasham
 1978 – Anakalari
 1978 – Puthariyankam
 1978 – Gandharvam
 1978 – Chakrayudham
 1978 – Theeragal
 1978 – Aalmarattom
 1978 – Society Lady
 1978 – Jalatharangam
 1978 – Viswaroopam
 1978 – Adikkadi
 1978 – Anayum Ambariyum 
 1978 – Pockettadikkari 
 1978 – Kanalkattakal as Maaran/Venu
 1978 – Black Belt
 1978 - Karimpuli
 1978 – Mani Koya Kurup
 1978 – Snehathinte Mukhangal 
 1978 – Tiger salim 
 1978 – Pavadakkari 
 1978 – Adimakachavadam 
 1977 – Unnai Suttrum Ulagam a Tamil movie
 1977 – Angeekaaram as Vijayan
 1977 – Penpuli
 1977 – Vezhambal
 1977 – Varadakshina
 1977 – Karnaparvam 
 1977 – Anugraham as Ravi
 1977 – Manassoru Mayil
 1977 – Anthardaaham
 1977 – Rajaparambara
 1977 – Pallavi
 1977 – Thaalappoli
 1977 – Alahu Akbar
 1977 – Bhaaryaavijayam
 1977 – Pattalam Janaki
 1977 – Sangamam
 1977 – Niraparayum Nilavilakkum
 1977 – Chakravarthini
 1977 – Ammaayi Amma
 1977 – Pattalam Janaki
 1976 – Chottanikkara Amma 
 1976 – Anubhavam
 1976 – Sexilla Stundilla
 1976 – Madhuram Thirumadhuram
 1976 – Rajanganam 
 1976 – Ayalkkari as Raju
 1976 – Sindhooram 
 1976 – Aalinganam as Vinod
 1976 – Priyamvada
 1976 – Abinandanam
 1976 – Anubavam
 1976 – Yudhabhoomi
 1976 – Manasaveena
 1976 – Kayamkulam Kochunnide Makan
 1976 – Kadarumasam
 1976 – Rathriyile Yathrakkar
 1976 – Conelum Collectorum
 1976 – Rajankanam
 1976 – Kuttichattan 
 1975 – Picnic 
 1975 – Boyfriend 
 1975 – Penpada as Venu
 1975 – Chandanachola 
 1975 – Priyamulla sofia 
 1975 – Tourist Banglow 
 1975 – Pravaham as Vijayan
 1975 – Bhoogolam Thiriyunnu 
 1975 – Karimpuli 
 1975 – Kalyanasouganthikam
 1975 – Velicham Akale
 1975 – Mattoru Seetha
 1975 – Love Letter
 1975 – Criminals (Kayangal)
 1975 – Malsaram
 1975 – Priye Ninakuvendi
 1975 – Bharyaye Avashyamundu
 1975 – Dharmashethre Kurushethre
 1975 – Kalyanapanthal
 1975 – Ulsavam as Babu
 1974 – Pancha Thanthram as Circle Inspector
 1974 – Nathoon 
 1974 – Durga 
 1974 – Swarnavigraham
 1974 – Suprabatham
 1974 – Pattabhishekam as Kumar/Vincent
 1974 – Nadanmare Avashyamundu
 1974 – Poonthenaruvi as Sunny
 1973 – Panchavadi 
 1973 – Ragging 
 1973 – Kaadu as Veeran
 1973 – Achani
 1973 – Jesus 
 1973 – Manassu
 1973 – Aradika as Jayan
 1973 – Achani as Gopi
 1973 – Kavitha
 1973 – Manushyaputhran as Thommi
 1973 – Bhadradeepam as Mohan
 1973 – Azhakulla Saleena as Johny
 1973 – Urvashi Bharathi 
 1973 – Ladies Hostel as Ravi
 1973 – Padmavyuham as Sunny
 1973 – Driksakshi as Gopinath
 1973 – Kalachakram as Abhayan
 1972 – Kandavarundo as Shekhara Varma
 1972 – Achannum Bapayum as Devadas
 1972 – Taxi Car as Vincent
 1972 – Sathi
 1972 – Maravil Thirivu Sookshikkuka as Murukan 
 1971 – Karakanakadal as Joykutty
 1971 – Ratrivandi as Babu
 1971 – Kochaniyathi as Mohan
 1971 – Moonu Pookkal
 1971 – Ernakulam Junction as Thampi 
 1970 – Madhuvidhu as Gopi/Madhu (double role)
 1970 – Bheekara Nimishagal as Murali 
 1970 – Moodalmanju as Prasad
 1970 – Swapnangal as Chandran
 1970 - Nazhikakkallu (uncreditted roll)
 1969 – Rest house

References

External links
 Vincent at MSI
 

Male actors from Kerala
Indian male film actors
1936 births
1991 deaths
20th-century Indian male actors
People from Ernakulam district
Male actors in Malayalam cinema